Howell Albert John Evans (3 March 1928 – 9 September 2014) was a Welsh actor, comedian, and singer who worked extensively in television and theatre roles in a career spanning over 60 years. He was best known for having played "Daddy" in the Sky1 TV comedy drama series Stella.

Biography
He was born in Maesteg, and first performed as an impressionist during the Second World War. After the war, he joined the Carroll Levis Discovery Show, and formed a comedy double act with his wife, Patricia Kane, working together for many years in music hall, variety shows and pantomime. He later appeared in many television shows including Coronation Street, Casualty, Open All Hours, and The Story of Tracy Beaker.

Personal life
Evans married actress Patricia Kane in 1950 with the marriage producing one child in 1953. Evans died on 9 September 2014 at the age of 86 and was survived by his wife and son.

Filmography

References

External links

1928 births
2014 deaths
Welsh male stage actors
Welsh male television actors
People from Maesteg